Naval Base Impalila is a riverine base of the Namibian Navy. It is located on Impalila Island  at the confluence of the Zambezi and Chobe rivers.

History
The base was originally constructed by the South African Defence Force and used by the South African Marine Corps. It was abandoned in 1989 during South Africa's withdrawal from Namibia. After Namibia's independence it was used as a secondary school. In 2011 the Namibian Navy conducted a Navy Coastal-land, Riverine and Meteorological survey, which found critical security gaps. The report led to the creation of the naval district covering Zambezi, Chobe and Okavango rivers. Rehabilitation of the base began in 2014 and was completed in 2017.

Current status
The base was commissioned into service by the Minister of Defence Penda ya Ndakolo on 21 June 2019. A Namibian Marine Corps Operational Boat Team is permanently stationed at the base and conducts riverine patrols.

Commandants

References

Military of Namibia
2019 establishments in Namibia